The Golden Snare is a 1921 American drama film written and directed by David Hartford. It is based on the 1921 novel The Golden Snare by James Oliver Curwood. The film stars Lewis Stone, Wallace Beery, Melbourne MacDowell, Ruth Renick, Wellington A. Playter, and DeWitt Jennings. The film was released on July 10, 1921, by Associated First National Pictures.

Cast      
Lewis Stone as Sergeant Philip Raine
Wallace Beery as Bram Johnson
Melbourne MacDowell as Doug Johnson
Ruth Renick as Celie
Wellington A. Playter as 'Black' Dawson 
DeWitt Jennings as 'Fighting' Fitzgerald
Francis McDonald as Pierre Thoreau
Little Esther Scott as Baby

References

External links

 

1921 films
1920s English-language films
Silent American drama films
1921 drama films
First National Pictures films
Films directed by David Hartford
American silent feature films
American black-and-white films
Northern (genre) films
Royal Canadian Mounted Police in fiction
Films based on works by James Oliver Curwood
1920s American films